Dream pop (also typeset as dreampop) is a subgenre of alternative rock and neo-psychedelia that emphasizes atmosphere and sonic texture as much as pop melody. Common characteristics include breathy vocals, dense productions, and effects such as reverb, echo, tremolo, and chorus.  It often overlaps with the related genre of shoegaze, and the two genre terms have at times been used interchangeably.

The genre came into prominence in the 1980s through the work of groups such as Cocteau Twins and A.R. Kane. Subsequently, acts such as My Bloody Valentine, Slowdive, Galaxie 500, Julee Cruise, Lush, and Mazzy Star released significant albums in the style. It saw renewed popularity among millennial listeners following the late-'00s success of Beach House.

Characteristics

The term dream pop is thought to relate to the "immersion" in the music experienced by the listener. The AllMusic Guide to Electronica (2003) defined dream pop as "an atmospheric subgenre of alternative rock that relies on sonic textures as much as melody". According to Paste, the genre emphasizes mood and sonics over lyrics, so that "chords and tracks blur seamlessly into one another so frequently that it can be difficult to even decipher when one song ended and another has begun." Common characteristics are breathy vocals, the use of guitar effects, and a densely produced sound, with "nebulous, distorted guitars" paired with "murmured vocals sometimes completely smudged into a wall of noise." The music tends to focus on textures rather than propulsive rock riffs. Effects such as reverb and echo are ubiquitous, with tremolo and chorus also heard on recordings.

Lyrics are often introspective or existential in nature, but may be difficult to hear or incomprehensible in the mix. In the view of critic Simon Reynolds, dream pop "celebrates rapturous and transcendent experiences, often using druggy and mystical imagery". In 1991, he suggested this escapist tendency might be a response to the cultural landscape of the UK during the 1980s: "After 12 years of Conservative government in Britain, any idealism or constructive political involvement seems futile to these alienated middle-class dropouts." Similarly, according to Rachel Felder, dream pop artists often resist representations of social reality in favour of ambiguous or hallucinogenic experiences.

History

1960s–1970s: Origins
Author Nathan Wiseman-Trowse writes that the "approach to the sheer physicality of sound" integral to dream pop was "arguably pioneered in popular music by figures such as Phil Spector and [Beach Boys founder] Brian Wilson." The music of the Velvet Underground in the 1960s and 1970s, which experimented with repetition, tone and texture over conventional song structure, was also an important touchstone in the genre's development. Their 1967 debut The Velvet Underground & Nico incorporated what music critic Marc Beamount terms "psychedelic dream pop" in addition to a variety of other styles. 1960s band the Byrds would influence the "swoony harmonies" of later British dream pop groups.

The Beach Boys recorded an early dream pop song, "All I Wanna Do", for their 1970 album Sunflower. Critic Jim Allen, who cites the Beach Boys as the "godfathers" of dream pop, says that the song's unprecedented "cinematic dream sequence" production style marks the point "where the dream pop family tree starts to come into focus." However, because the group were predominantly known for hit singles such as "Kokomo" during the 1980s, critics had largely disregarded the band's 1970s recording output, and the Beach Boys' impact on the genre was not widely acknowledged until after the 2000s.

Music journalist John Bergstrom recognises George Harrison's 1970 track "Let It Down" as a progenitor of the genre, while stating that its Spector-produced parent album All Things Must Pass influenced "many guitar-driven, echo-drenched bands have come around since, mixing powerful rave-ups with moody, reflective down-tempo numbers and a spiritual bent.

Early–mid 1980s: Development 
A.J. Ramirez of PopMatters recognises an evolutionary line from gothic rock to dream pop. The early 1980s gothic-derived "ethereal wave" subgenre, with its effects-laden guitar sounds and female vocals, led to the dream pop and shoegaze scenes; it was represented by Cocteau Twins and labels such as 4AD and Projekt Records. Rolling Stone describes "modern dream pop" as originating with the early 1980s work of Cocteau Twins and their contemporaries. AllMusic's Jason Ankeny credits the Cocteau Twins' "distinctly ethereal" sound and singer Elizabeth Fraser's operatic, indecipherable vocals with defining their label, the UK-based 4AD. According to Pitchfork, Vini Reilly of the Durutti Column "embodied the cliché of the suicidal dream-pop guitarist in the mid-1980s" with his "narcotic performances" presaging later acts such as My Bloody Valentine and Galaxie 500.

The 1984 album It'll End in Tears by 4AD's "dream-pop supergroup" This Mortal Coil was conceived by label head Ivo Watts-Russell and featured members of Cocteau Twins and Dead Can Dance. The album helped "set the template for dream pop" and associated the formerly gothic-affiliated UK label with the style. The album's 1983 single, the Tim Buckley cover "Song to the Siren", became an influential work in the genre, and saw success in the UK Indie Chart, remaining there consistently for two years. Film director David Lynch, unable to obtain the rights to This Mortal Coil's version of "Song to the Siren" for his 1986 film Blue Velvet, enlisted composer Angelo Badalamenti and singer Julee Cruise to record a replacement track. The result was "Mysteries of Love", described by Rolling Stone as a significant development of the dream pop sound which "gave the genre its synthy sheen". The trio of Cruise, Lynch and Badalamenti later recorded the 1989 album Floating into the Night, which further elaborated on the style and featured the Twin Peaks theme and UK top 10 single "Falling".

Late 1980s–1990s: Shoegaze scene

The term "dreampop" was coined in the late 1980s by Alex Ayuli of A.R. Kane to describe his band's eclectic sound, which blended ethereal dub production, effects-laden guitar, and drum machine backing, among other influences. The group signed to 4AD to release their 1987 EP Lollita, produced by Cocteau Twins guitarist Robin Guthrie. Pitchfork describes their debut album Sixty Nine (1988) as a "crucial document" of the dream pop movement, commenting that the group "aimed to emulate an ethereality that could just as easily become nightmarish," resulting in music that feels "just out of reach, like your memory struggling to grasp the last wisp of a dream before it slips away." Their "dreampop" label was subsequently adopted by music critic Simon Reynolds to describe that group and later extended to the nascent shoegazing scene in the UK. Reynolds describes the movement as "a wave of hazy neo-psychedelic groups" characterised by a "blurry, blissful sound", and credits the influence of the "ethereal soundscapes" of Cocteau Twins as well as more distorted styles of American alternative rock.

In the 1990s, "dream pop" and "shoegazing" were interchangeable and regionally dependent terms, with "dream pop" being the name by which "shoegazing" was typically known in America. AllMusic describes the dream pop label as covering both the "loud, shimmering feedback" of My Bloody Valentine and the "post-Velvet Underground guitar rock" of Galaxie 500. My Bloody Valentine showcased a unique dream pop sound on their 1988 debut album Isn't Anything, with guitarist Kevin Shields employing a tremolo-arm technique in order to produce "an amorphous drone, at once visceral and disembodied". Galaxie 500 provided a "cornerstone" of the genre in their 1989 album On Fire, with their downtempo, reverb-laden sound becoming influential. UK bands acts as A.R. Kane, My Bloody Valentine and Ride played an influential role in the development of the movement. Other prominent acts to emerge from the movement include Slowdive and Chapterhouse.

The 1990 Cocteau Twins album Heaven or Las Vegas proved an iconic release in the genre. The UK band Lush became an influential act in the genre during the 1990s, with Robin Guthrie producing their 1992 debut album Spooky. The 1993 album So Tonight That I Might See by American band Mazzy Star reflected a dream pop sound specific to "the glitzy decay that is L.A.", according to Pitchfork; that publication called the album a "dream pop classic". The late 1980s dream pop of A.R. Kane and My Bloody Valentine influenced 1990s acts such as Seefeel and Insides, who began incorporating elements such as samples and sequenced rhythms. Ambient pop music is described by AllMusic as "essentially an extension of the dream pop that emerged in the wake of the shoegazer movement", distinct for its incorporation of electronic textures and techniques such as sampling.

2000s: Contemporary developments
The 2007 album Person Pitch by Panda Bear combined Beach Boys-influenced dream pop with modern sampledelic techniques, winning acclaim and exerting a wide influence.
Much of the music associated with the 2009-coined term "chillwave" could be considered dream pop; In the opinion of Grantlands David Schilling, the critical discussion surrounding "chillwave" revealed that labels such as "shoegaze" and "dream pop" were ultimately "arbitrary and meaningless". The 2010 album Teen Dream by Baltimore duo Beach House established the group as purveyors of modern dream pop that drew on the "languid reveries" of Cocteau Twins, Mazzy Star and Galaxie 500. The group's success in the late 2000s solidified the popularity of dream pop with millennial listeners.

List of artists

See also
 Noise pop
 Ethereal wave
 Vaporwave

References

 

 
Neo-psychedelia
1980s neologisms
British styles of music
British rock music genres
1980s in music
1990s in music
2000s in music
2010s in music